Guildford Lightning are a women's ice hockey team whose home and training ground is at the Guildford Spectrum in Guildford, Surrey, England. The team competes in the Women's Elite League, the top level in the country.

Honours
1993-94 Knockout Cup Winners

1993-94 Southern Conference League Champions

2000-01 Swindon Tournament Winners

2000-01 Chairman's Cup Playoff Champions

2000-01 Premier League Champions

2001-02 Chairman's Cup Playoff Runners-Up

2001-02 Premier League Champions

2002-03 Swindon Tournament Winners

2003-04 Chairman's Cup Playoff Runners-Up

2006-07 EIHA Premier Sportmanship Award

2007-08 EIHA Premier Sportsmanship Award

2008-09 Swindon Tournament Winners

2008-09 Chairman's Cup Playoff Runners-Up

2011-12 Premier League Playoff Runners-Up

See also
2014–15 Guildford Lightning season

References

External links
Official Guildford Lightning website

  
Guildford Flames
Women's ice hockey teams in the United Kingdom
Sport in Guildford